Scalptia costifera is a species of sea snail, a marine gastropod mollusc in the family Cancellariidae, the nutmeg snails.

Description

Distribution
This species occurs in the Indian Ocean off Madagascar and Tanzania.

References

 Dautzenberg, Ph. (1929). Contribution à l'étude de la faune de Madagascar: Mollusca marina testacea. Faune des colonies françaises, III(fasc. 4). Société d'Editions géographiques, maritimes et coloniales: Paris. 321–636, plates IV-VII pp. 
 Hemmen J. (2007). Recent Cancellariidae. Wiesbaden, 428pp.
 Petit R.E. (2009) George Brettingham Sowerby, I, II & III: their conchological publications and molluscan taxa. Zootaxa 2189: 1–218.
 Patterson Edward, J. K.; Ravinesh, R. & Biju Kumar, A. (2022). Molluscs of the Gulf of Mannar, India and adjacent waters: A fully illustrated guide. Suganthi Devadason Marien Research Institute & Department of Aquatic Biology and Fisheries, University of Kerala. Tuticorin. i-xx, 1-524.

External links
 Sowerby, G. B. I. (1832-1833). Cancellaria. In: The Conchological Illustrations. London. Parts 9–13. 5 pls with explanations 

Cancellariidae
Gastropods described in 1832